Sea Rex 3D: Journey to a Prehistoric World, also known simply as Sea Rex, is a 2010 3D film directed by Ronan Chapalain and which was released to IMAX theaters in 2010. It was released on Blu-ray and Blu-ray 3D in November 2010.

Human characters
Julie: An American teenage blonde girl who discovers the wonders of prehistory.
Georges Cuvier: A comparative anatomist who shows Julie the history of the marine reptiles.

Prehistoric Animals

Quetzalcoatlus
Parasaurolophus
Elasmosaurus
Liopleurodon
Tanystropheus
Placochelys
Rhomaleosaurus
Ammonites
Leedsichthys
Mosasaurus
Ichthyornis
Cryptoclidus
Nothosaurus
Shonisaurus
Ophthalmosaurus
Mixosaurus
Prognathodon
Cretoxyrhina
Otodus
Rhamphorhynchus
Megalosaurus
Brachiosaurus
Dakosaurus
Stegosaurus
Kronosaurus

Production
The production of Sea Rex's plot is in Development, with 3D entertainment and National Geographic distributed the film.

External links

References

2010 films
2010 3D films
3D Entertainment films
IMAX short films
2010 short documentary films
Documentary films about prehistoric life
3D short films
3D documentary films
Documentary films about dinosaurs
2010s English-language films
Prequel films
Films about parallel universes
National Geographic Society films

fr:Pascal Vuong